Halinen (Finnish; Hallis in Swedish) is a district and a suburb of the city of Turku, Finland. It is located in the north-eastern part of the city, bordering the Littoinen district in Kaarina. It is rather densely populated, having a population of 3,501, with an annual growth rate of 0.34%.

23.11% of the district's population are under 15 years old, while only 3.43% are over 65, making the district one of the youngest in Turku. The district's linguistic makeup is 50% Finnish, 4.51% Swedish, and 45% other. This reflects the fact that Halinen is one of the areas with the highest proportion of immigrants in the city, as well as one with a high student population.

See also
 Districts of Turku
 Districts of Turku by population

External links 
 

Districts of Turku